The 2023 Men's EuroHockey Championship Qualifiers was a series of 4 qualification events for the 2023 EuroHockey Championships in Mönchengladbach. The tournaments were held in Spain, France, Austria and Scotland between 17 and 27 August 2022.

The top team from each tournament qualified for the EuroHockey Championships. The second and third ranked teams from each group advanced to the EuroHockey Championship II, with the remaining teams advancing to the EuroHockey Championship III.

Qualification
All eligible teams from the 2021 editions of the EuroHockey Championships II and III will participate, as well as the four lowest ranked teams from the EuroHockey Championships.

Qualifier A

Qualifier A was held in Ourense, Spain from 17 to 20 August 2022.

Standings

Results

Qualifier B

Qualifier B was held in Calais, France from 24 to 27 August 2022.

Standings

Results

Qualifier C

Qualifier C was held in Vienna, Austria from 23 to 26 August 2022.

Standings

Results

Qualifier D

Qualifier D was held in Glasgow, Scotland from 24 to 27 August 2022.

Standings

Results

Goalscorers

See also
 2023 Women's EuroHockey Championship Qualifiers

References

External links
European Hockey Federation

Men's EuroHockey Nations Championship qualification
Qualifiers
EuroHockey Championship
EuroHockey Championship
EuroHockey Championship
EuroHockey Championship
International field hockey competitions hosted by Austria
International field hockey competitions hosted by Scotland
International field hockey competitions hosted by Spain
International field hockey competitions hosted by France
EuroHockey Championship
Qualifiers